Homonota septentrionalis is a species of gecko. It lives in Paraguay and Bolivia.

References

Homonota
Reptiles of Bolivia
Reptiles of Paraguay
Reptiles described in 2017
Taxa named by Gunther Köhler